Five is a 1951 American horror science fiction film that was produced, written, and directed by Arch Oboler. The film stars William Phipps, Susan Douglas Rubeš, James Anderson, Charles Lampkin, and Earl Lee. Five was distributed by Columbia Pictures.

The film's storyline involves five survivors, one woman and four men, of an atomic bomb disaster. It appears to have wiped out the rest of the human race while leaving all infrastructure intact. The five come together at a remote, isolated hillside house, where they try to figure out how to survive and come to terms with the loss of their own personal worlds.

Plot
Roseanne Rogers trudges from place to place, searching for another living human being. A Mountain News headline reports a scientist's warning that detonating a new type of atomic bomb could cause the extinction of humanity.

Rosanne eventually makes her way to her aunt's isolated hillside house and faints when she finds Michael already living there. At first, she is too numb to speak and slow to recover. She later resists Michael's attempted sexual assault, revealing that she is married and also pregnant.

Two more survivors arrive, attracted by the smoke coming from the house's chimney. Oliver P. Barnstaple is an elderly bank clerk who is in denial about his situation; he believes that he is simply on vacation. Since the atomic disaster, he has been taken care of by Charles, a thoughtful and affable African American. They both survived because they were accidentally locked in a bank vault when the disaster happened. Roseanne was in a hospital's lead-lined X-ray room, while Michael was in an elevator in New York City's Empire State Building.

Barnstaple sickens, but seems to recover and then insists on going to the beach. There, they drag a man named Eric out of the ocean. A mountain climber, he was stranded on Mount Everest by a blizzard during the atomic disaster. He was flying back to the United States when his aircraft ran out of fuel just short of land. Meanwhile, Barnstaple dies peacefully.

Eric quickly sows discord among the group. He theorizes that they are somehow immune to the radiation and wants to find and gather together other survivors. Michael, however, is skeptical and warns that radiation will be the most concentrated in the cities Eric wants to search.

The newcomer later reveals himself to be a racist; he can barely stand living with Charles. When Charles objects, he and Eric fight, stopping only when Roseanne goes into labor; she gives birth to a boy, delivered by Michael. Afterwards, while the others work to make a better life, Eric goes off by himself. Maliciously, he drives their jeep through the group's cultivated field, destroying part of their crops. Michael orders Eric to leave, but Eric produces a pistol and announces that he will leave only when he is ready.

Later one night, Eric tells Roseanne that he is going to the city (Oak Ridge). Wanting to discover her husband's fate, Roseanne agrees to go with him, as he had hoped; he insists that she not tell Michael. After stealing supplies, Eric is stopped by a suspicious Charles; in the ensuing struggle, he stabs Charles in the back, killing him.

Once they reach the city, Eric begins looting, while Roseanne goes to her husband's office and then to a nearby hospital's waiting room; there she discovers her husband's remains. She wants to return to Michael, but Eric refuses to let her go. When they struggle, his shirt is torn open, revealing signs of advanced radiation poisoning. In despair, he runs away.

Rosanne begins the long walk back to the house, but along the way, her baby dies. Michael, who has been searching for her, eventually finds her. After burying her son, they return to the house. Michael silently resumes cultivating the soil, and Rosanne joins him.

Cast
 William Phipps as Michael Rogin
 Susan Douglas Rubeš as Roseanne Rogers
 James Anderson as Eric
 Charles Lampkin as Charles
 Earl Lee as Oliver P. Barnstaple

Production
According to Robert Osborne of Turner Classic Movies, the film is the first to depict the aftermath of an Earthly atomic bomb catastrophe.

The unusual house that is the setting for most of the film was designed by Frank Lloyd Wright and was the separate guesthouse of the ranch of producer/director/writer Arch Oboler, located at 32436 Mulholland Highway in Malibu, California.  The house burned to the ground, with only the foundations remaining, in the 2018 Woolsey Fire, which swept through the area.

Actor Charles Lampkin came to Oboler's notice when reading the prose poem "The Creation" by James Weldon Johnson on a Los Angeles TV program. and convinced him to include excerpts of it in the final script of Five. It would become Lampkin's soliloquy for his character Charles; this may be the first time that audiences in the USA, Latin America, and Europe were exposed to African-American poetry, albeit not identified as such in the film.

Oboler shot this very low budget feature for $75,000, using as his crew a small group of recent graduates from the University of Southern California film school and starring five (then) unknown actors. Upon its completion, Oboler sold the film to Columbia Pictures for a large profit.

Reception
Film reviewer Bosley Crowther in his review for The New York Times, noted the characters handicapped the film as much as the tepid plot line created by Arch Oboler, "the five people whom he has selected to forward the race of man are so cheerless, banal and generally static that they stir little interest in their fate. Furthermore, Mr. Oboler has imagined so little of significance for them to do in their fearfully unique situation that there is nothing to be learned from watching them. Mr. Oboler might as well be presenting five castaways on a desert isle".

In a recent review film critic Sean Axmaker lauded the film, writing, "For all of his budgetary limitations, it's a strikingly atmospheric and handsome film, and Oboler creates an eerie sense of isolation with simple techniques".

In other films
During the film Great Balls of Fire!, the characters Jerry Lee Lewis and his future wife Myra Gale Brown can be seen watching Five in a scene.

See also

 List of apocalyptic films
 List of apocalyptic and post-apocalyptic fiction
 List of science fiction films of the 1950s

References

Notes

Bibliography

 Stephens, Bob. "D is for doomsday: Five." in Rickman, Gregg. The Science Fiction Film Reader. New York: Limelight Editions, 2004. .
 Strick, Philip. Science Fiction Movies. 1976. London: Octopus Books Limited. .
Warren, Bill. Keep Watching the Skies: American Science Fiction Films of the Fifties, 21st Century Edition (an edited and expanded 3rd printing in a single volume). Jefferson, North Carolina: McFarland & Company, 2009. .

External links
 
 
 
 
 Five at DVD Beaver (includes images)
 

1951 films
1951 horror films
1950s science fiction horror films
American science fiction films
American black-and-white films
Films about nuclear war and weapons
Films directed by Arch Oboler
American post-apocalyptic films
Columbia Pictures films
American pregnancy films
1950s English-language films
1950s American films